The pair skating competition of the 2020 Winter Youth Olympics was held at the Lausanne Skating Arena on 10 January (short program) and 12 January 2020 (free skating).

Results

Short program
The short program was held on 10 January at 13:30.

Free skating
The free skating was held on 12 January at 11:30.

Overall

References 

Pair skating